143 may refer to:

143 (number), a natural number
AD 143, a year of the 2nd century AD
143 BC, a year of the 2nd century BC
143 (EP), a 2013 EP by Tiffany Evans
143 (album), a 2015 album by Bars and Melody
143 (2004 film), a 2004 Indian Telugu film 
143 (2022 film), a 2022 Indian Marathi film 
143, a song by Set It Off from their 2009 EP, Calm Before the Storm
"1-4-3 (I Love You)", a 2013 song by Henry Lau
143 (West Midlands) Brigade
143 Records, record label of producer David Foster
 KiYa 143, a locomotive type

See also
 List of highways numbered 143